Luis Barrios Tassano (San Carlos, Uruguay, 26 August 1935 – Montevideo, 15 December 1991) was a Uruguayan lawyer and diplomat.

A man of the Colorado Party, when the democracy came back in 1985 he was appointed Ambassador to Argentina. He further undertook a decisive action in order to establish bilateral relations with the People's Republic of China. Later he was appointed as Ministry of Foreign Relations (1988–1990).

References

1935 births
1991 deaths
People from San Carlos, Uruguay
20th-century Uruguayan lawyers
Colorado Party (Uruguay) politicians
Ambassadors of Uruguay to Argentina
Foreign ministers of Uruguay